The Arrowtown Chinese Settlement is a heritage listed, historic village located in Arrowtown, New Zealand and set up by Chinese people during the Otago Gold Rush of the 1860s.
The settlement is sometimes referred to as a village and has been restored and is now a common tourist attraction. It is close to Arrowtown on the banks of Bush Creek which is a tributary of the Arrow River.

Ah Lum is a well known example of the Chinese miners who lived in the area, his store is a category 1 listed building through Heritage New Zealand Pouhere Taonga.

References

Otago Gold Rush
History of Otago
Chinatowns in Oceania
Immigration to New Zealand